Virpi Niemi (née Ranne, born April 8, 1966) is a Finnish cross-country skier who competed in 1995. Her best World Cup finish was 26th in a 15 km event in Japan that same year.

At the 1995 FIS Nordic World Ski Championships in Thunder Bay, Niemi finished 19th in the 5 km, 24th in the 30 km, 26th in the 15 km, and 31st in the 5 km + 10 km combined pursuit events.

Cross-country skiing results
All results are sourced from the International Ski Federation (FIS).

World Championships

World Cup

Season standings

References

External links

1966 births
Finnish female cross-country skiers
Living people
20th-century Finnish women